Roger Casslind is a Swedish former footballer. He made 56 Allsvenskan appearances and two goals for Djurgården.

References

Swedish footballers
Allsvenskan players
Djurgårdens IF Fotboll players
Year of birth missing (living people)
Living people

Association footballers not categorized by position